The girls' tournament in 3x3 basketball at the 2018 Summer Youth Olympics was held from 7 to 17 October 2018 at the Parque Mujeres Argentinas in Buenos Aires.

Preliminary rounds
All times are given in Central European Time.

Group A

Group B

Group C

Group D

Knockout round

Final standings

References

External links

Girls